Muhammad Nabeel Zafar  credited as Nabeel (‎;born Muhammad Nadeem Zafar) is a Pakistani television actor, director and writer. He is known for the comedy sitcom Bulbulay on ARY Digital in which he plays the role of Nabeel since 2009. He appeared in the 1994 drama Dhuwan on PTV Home, as well as Honeymoon and Shadi Ka Laddu on Express Entertainment.

Career 
Nabeel has worked in the television industry since the early 1990s in PTV plays such as "Din" telecast in 1992. He played a doctor in PTV's popular show Dhuwan in 1994. Later, he started appearing regularly in the television serials at PTV, playing lead parts in Ajaib Khana, Shahla Kot, Alao and Qissa Saat Raaton Ka. In 2009 he started playing the lead role in ARY Digital's sitcom, Bulbulay.

Nabeel joined BOL Entertainment as President and CEO.

Selected television work

Filmography

See also 
 List of Pakistani actors

References

External links
 

1968 births
Living people
Pakistani male television actors
Pakistani television directors
Pakistani television writers
Pakistani male film actors
People from Faisalabad
People from Toba Tek Singh District
Punjabi people
ARY Digital people
BOL Network people
Male television writers
Male actors in Urdu cinema